Jaime Mendez (born February 20, 1971) is a former American collegiate football free safety, who was an all-American at Kansas State University.  He is the Wildcats' all-time career leader in interceptions with 15.

High school
Mendez was an all-state selection at Cardinal Mooney, the same school that produced former Wildcat co-defensive coordinator Bob Stoops and former defensive ends coach Mike Stoops.  His coach was Don Bucci.  He helped high school team register eight shutouts in 1987 en route to a 13-1 record and the Division III state title. Jaime's greatest game was his only loss that year but was in double overtime against Elvis Grbac - 1988
Desmond Howard-1988.(both of Cleveland St. Joe's) Cardinal Mooney also captured the league title in 1988.  Mendez was a sprinter on the high school track team along with serving as all seniors at Cardinal Mooney do as a football team captain.

College career
After redshirting in 1989, Mendez tied the K-State season record with six interceptions and broke the school standard for interception return yardage with 154 yards as a redshirt freshmen in 1990.  He was an honorable mention All-Big 8, as well as newcomer of the year.  He was ninth nationally in interceptions.  As a sophomore in 1991, he earned first team All-Big 8 as well as being named third-team All-American.  He finished third on the team with 79 tackles and fourth in the Big 8 with nine passes broken up.  As a junior in 1992, he earned consensus first-team All-Big Eight honors as well as honorable mention all-America honors.  He set a modern-day Big 8 record and school record with four interceptions in a win over Temple, including three in the first half.  As a senior in 1993,  he again earned Consensus first-team All-American honors and earned first-team All-Big Eight once again.  He was one of eight semifinalists for the Jim Thorpe Award  He was named team's co-MVP and Co-captained team to a 9-2-1 record and the school's first bowl victory in a 52-17 blowout against Wyoming in the 1993 Copper Bowl.

Career statistics

Personal life
Mendez, who is of Puerto Rican descent, was married to actress Essence Atkins on September 26, 2009 and divorced in 2016. 
The couple reside in Los Angeles. On August 9, 2011, the couple announced that they were expecting their first child together. Essence gave birth to a son, named Varro Blair Mendez on December 25, 2011. The couple announced the news via Twitter. The couple divorced in 2016.

References

^ Elaine Aradillas (2009-10-15). "Half and Half's Essence Atkins Says I Do". People Magazine. Retrieved 2009-10-15.

Kansas State Wildcats football players
Players of American football from Youngstown, Ohio
1971 births
Living people